Nebria pektusanica is a species of ground beetle in the Nebriinae subfamily that can be found in Jilin province of China, at the elevation of . It can also be found in North Korea.

References

pektusanica
Beetles described in 1973
Beetles of Asia